This is a list of rivers of Saint Martin. Rivers are listed in clockwise order, starting at the north end of the island.
Paradise Ravine 
Quarter's Ravine
Colombier Ravine
Lottery Ravine
Saint-Louis Ravine
Careta Ravine

References
St. Martin map

Saint Martin
Landforms of the Collectivity of Saint Martin